Spiderbait is the seventh studio album by Australian rock band Spiderbait. It is the band's first album since 2005's Greatest Hits compilation, and first studio album since Tonight Alright in 2004.

Track listing

Charts

Release history

References 

2013 albums
Spiderbait albums